Virginia Weiffenbach Kettering (1907 - 2003) was Dayton, Ohio's leading philanthropist and patron of the arts.

Early life and education
Kettering was born July 15, 1907 in Bellevue, Kentucky to architect and marble importer Norman and Clara Weiffenbach. She was their only child.

She attended Moraine Park School, where she met husband-to-be Eugene Kettering, Margaret Morrison Carnegie College, Carnegie Tech, and Lutherville Seminary.

Philanthropist
In 1959, soon after moving to Dayton, the Ketterings announced they would donate two-thirds of the cost of building Kettering Memorial Hospital, named in honor of Eugene's father, Charles F. Kettering, who had died the previous year, if the remainder were raised by the community. The hospital opened in 1964.

In the 1960s Kettering and her husband worked to create the United States Air Force Museum in Dayton, a pet project of Eugene's. When her husband died in 1969, Kettering took over the project. "Her determination, logic, and meticulous attention kept the projects on track."

In 1972 Kettering founded the Dayton Holiday Festival and Children's Parade and work was completed on Kettering Tower.

In 1974 Kettering conceived and led the development of Courthouse Plaza, a downtown gathering space.

Kettering provided the impetus to refurbish the Victoria Theatre, a historic building in downtown Dayton. She conditioned the donation on the development of a downtown performing arts center. The Victoria Theatre refurbishment was completed in 1988 and the Schuster Performing Arts Center open nearby shortly after her death.

In 1996 Kettering donated $4 million for expansion the Dayton Art Institute and established a $1 million scholarship fund for Wright State University Medical School students who will serve elderly patients in Dayton for two years.

In 2000 Kettering established the $4.5-million dollar Dayton Foundation Virginia W. Kettering Fund to "further the public good" and donated $2 million to Carillon Historical Park.

Kettering was the first individual contributor to the Fraze Pavilion project, which created an outdoor performance space in Kettering, Ohio, a suburb of Dayton named after Kettering's father-in-law.

Gifts to the University of Dayton and Wright State University exceeded $16.5 million during Kettering's lifetime. Total gifts throughout her lifetime have been "estimated very conservatively" at $150 million.

The Kettering Foundation supports charitable and community projects in eight counties surrounding Dayton plus the Sloan-Kettering Institute, the Cincinnati Zoo, and Kettering University.

Impact
In her 2003 front-page obituary, the Dayton Daily News called her, "the Dayton region's leading philanthropist and arts patron." Her 1997 induction into the Dayton Walk of Fame said she "changed the face of the region through her philanthropy." Dayton Foundation president Mike Parks said, "There isn't a sector of our community that hasn't been touched by her generous hand."

Personal life
Kettering married Eugene Williams Kettering on April 15, 1930. She was widowed in 1969 and in 1973 married retired Mead Papers president H. Warren Kampf. She was widowed again in 1979.

She and Kettering had three children. Kettering is buried in Woodland Cemetery and Arboretum.

The Ketterings lived in Hinsdale, Illinois until the 1958 death of Eugene's father Charles F. Kettering, when they moved back to Dayton to take over management of the family's interests.

Trustee and Director
 Banc One Corporation, Director
 Memorial Sloan-Kettering Cancer Center, Director
 Young Women's Christian Association World Service Council, Director
 Asia Society, Director
 Air Force Museum Foundation, Director
 Robert Crown Center for Health Education, Director
 C. F. Kettering, Inc., Director
 The Kettering Fund, Trustee
 The Kettering Family Foundation, Trustee
 The Arts Center Foundation, Trustee
 The Miriam Rosenthal Fund, Trustee
 The Kettering Medical Center, Trustee
 The University of Dayton, Trustee
 Wright State University, Trustee
 1971 - 1980 University of Dayton Board of Trustees

Awards and honors
 Almoner Award from Madonna Center Associates of Chicago
 Citation Of Honor from Wright Memorial Chapter, Air Force Association
 Award Of Merit from Contractors of America
 Service To Mankind Award from Optimist Club
 Hadassah Myrtle Wreath Award
 Dayton's Ten Top Women Of The Year Award
 Citizens Legion Of Honor awarded by the Presidents Club Of Dayton
 City Of Dayton Manager's Top Flight Award For Outstanding Service
 Walk Of Fame Dayton Municipal Airport
 The Fellows Program (Highest Honor Bestowed By The Engineers Club)
 Friendship Award (National Conference for Community & Justice of Greater Dayton)
 1995 Ohio Arts Council Governor's Award
 1997 Dayton Walk of Fame
 2003 Heart of Dayton (American Heart Association)
 Virginia W. Kettering Hall: Residence and Dining Hall at The University of Dayton

Honorary degrees
 The University of Dayton
 Wright State University 
 Skidmore College
 GMI Engineering & Management Institute (Now Kettering University)

References

Philanthropists from Ohio
1907 births
2003 deaths
American women philanthropists
People from Dayton, Ohio
People from Bellevue, Kentucky
20th-century American philanthropists
20th-century women philanthropists